is a sub-kilometer near-Earth object and potentially hazardous asteroid of the Aten group, approximately  in diameter. It was first observed by astronomers of the LINEAR program on 5 March 2000 and followed until 14 March 2000, by which time it had dimmed to apparent magnitude 20 and was 40° from the Moon. By 17 March 2000 it was only 4 degrees from a 90% waxing gibbous moon. It has never been listed on the Sentry Risk Table because none of the potential orbital solutions create a risk of impact in the next ~100 years. The asteroid safely passed Earth on 17–18 February 2014. Due to a then-poorly determined orbit, the asteroid may have been significantly further from Earth and dozens of degrees from where the telescope was pointed during the 2014 approach.

Observations 
The 2014 approach was broadcast live (YouTube archive) on the Internet at 09:00 pm EST (02:00 UTC), 18 February 2014, by the Slooh community observatory. Slooh's observatory on Mount Teide in Spain's Canary Islands was iced over at the time, so images from the Slooh observatory in Dubai were used to attempt detection of the asteroid. At the time of the broadcast, no obvious image of the asteroid could be seen. Some viewers complained by Twitter that it was boring when the object was never shown in the images, while others said that "boring" was a good outcome for a pass-by.

Orbit 
 is an Aten-family asteroid, and as such is often near the glare of the Sun as the asteroid seldom travels outside Earth's orbit when the Earth is nearby. The orbit was poorly constrained in 2014 since the asteroid had an observation arc of only 9 days creating an orbital uncertainty of 7. Since the asteroid had not been observed since 14 March 2000, the uncertainty region had kept increasing. During the 2014 approach, 17 February 2014 was the first day that the nominal orbit had a solar elongation more than 90 degrees from the Sun making it easier to recover under a dark sky. Using the nominal orbit, the asteroid was expected to have an apparent magnitude of about 16 and pass  from Earth. Closest approach (perigee-geocentrical) was around 00:15 UTC on 18 February plus or minus about 13 hours. Due to the uncertainty region of the asteroid, the asteroid could have been 75 degrees from the nominal position in the sky on 18 February 2014.

 was recovered on 24 February 2017 at magnitude 21, extending the observation arc to 17 years. It is now known that  passed  from Earth on 17 February 2014.

Physical characteristics 
For a standard albedo of 0.14, it translates to a mean-diameter of 110 meters.

See also 
 List of asteroid close approaches to Earth in 2014
 List of asteroid close approaches to Earth
 2009 RR

References

External links 
 List Of Aten Minor Planets (by designation), Minor Planet Center
 
 
 

Minor planet object articles (unnumbered)

20140217
20000305